Hedychium griersonianum is a monocotyledonous plant species described by Rosemary Margaret Smith. Hedychium griersonianum is part of the genus Hedychium and the family Zingiberaceae. No subspecies are listed in the Catalog of Life.

References 

griersonianum
Taxa named by Rosemary Margaret Smith